Merino is a surname of Spanish origin, commonly found in Navarre, Burgos, and Seville. The surname originates from the medieval Latin maiorinus, a steward or head official of a village, from maior, meaning "greater".

People with the name
 Adalberto Almeida y Merino, (1916-2008), Mexican prelate of the Roman Catholic Church
 Alba Merino (born 1985), Spanish footballer
 Alexander Merino (born 1992), Peruvian tennis player
 Alfredo Merino Tamayo (born 1969), Spanish footballer and manager
 Ana Merino (born 1971), Spanish poet
 Ángel Merino (born 1966) Spanish footballer and manager
 Arturo Merino Benítez (1888–1970), Chilean aviator
 Aquilino Bocos Merino, C.M.F. (born 1938), Spanish prelate of the Catholic Church
 Beatriz Merino (born 1947), Prime Minister of Peru (Jun 2003 - Dec)
 Camila Merino, Chilean civil engineer and government minister
 Carlos Merino (born 1980), Spanish footballer
 Delfina Merino (born 1989), Argentine field hockey player
 Diego Merino (1570–1637), Roman Catholic bishop
 Eider Merino Cortazar (born 1994), Spanish cyclist
 Emilio Merino (born 1950), Chilean politician
 Esteban Gabriel Merino (died 1535), Spanish Roman Catholic bishop and cardinal
 Evaristo Merino (fl. 1900–1930), Chilean politician
 Fernando Arturo de Merino (1833–1906), Dominican priest and politician
 Francisca Merino (born 1973), Chilean actress
 Francisco Merino, Spanish karate practitioner
 Gustavo Gutiérrez Merino (born 1928), Peruvian philosopher and Dominican priest
 Ignacio Merino (1817–1876), Peruvian painter
 Igor Merino (born 1990), Spanish cyclist
 Jerónimo Merino (1769–1844), Spanish guerrilla fighter and priest
 Jesus Merino (born 1965), Spanish comic book artist
 John Merino (1967–2009), Ecuadorian colonel
 Jorge Merino (born 1991), Spanish footballer
 José Merino del Río (1949–2012), Costa Rican politician
 José Luis Merino (1927–2019), Spanish film director
 José María Merino (born 1941), Spanish novelist
 José Toribio Merino (1915–1996), Chilean admiral
 Juan Merino (born 1970), Spanish footballer and manager
 Julia Merino (born 1971), Spanish Olympic sprinter
 Manuel Merino (born 1961), Peruvian politician and former president
 Maria J. Merino (born 1950) Spanish pathologist and physician-scientist
 Mercedes Pérez Merino (born 1960), Spanish trade unionist and politician
 Mikel Merino (born 1996), Spanish footballer
 Olga Merino (born 1965), Spanish writer
 Pedro Merino (born 1987), Spanish cyclist
 Ramón Merino Loo (born 1960), Mexican politician
 Roberto Merino (born 1982), Peruvian footballer
 Roberto Merino (writer) (born 1961), Chilean writer
 Rolando Meriño (born 1971), Cuban Olympic baseball player
 Sabin Merino (born 1992), Spanish footballer
 Vicente Merino (1889–1977), Chilean naval officer and political figure
 Víctor Merino (born 1979), Salvadoran footballer
 Ingrid Wildi-Merino (born 1963), Chilean-born Swiss video artist

See also
 Marino (disambiguation)
 Merino (disambiguation)

References

Spanish-language surnames